This is a list of the mammal species recorded in Angola. Of the mammal species in Angola, one is critically endangered, five are endangered, eight are vulnerable, and ten are near threatened.

There are 291 extant species of mammals in Angola and 67 fossil species.

The following tags are used to highlight each species' conservation status as assessed by the International Union for Conservation of Nature:

Some species were assessed using an earlier set of criteria. Species assessed using this system have the following instead of near threatened and least concern categories:

Order: Afrosoricida (tenrecs and golden moles) 

The order Afrosoricida contains the golden moles of southern Africa and the tenrecs of Madagascar and Africa, two families of small mammals that were traditionally part of the order Insectivora.

Family: Tenrecidae (tenrecs)
Subfamily: Potamogalinae
Genus: Potamogale
 Giant otter shrew, Potamogale velox LC
Family: Chrysochloridae
Subfamily: Amblysominae
Genus: Calcochloris
 Congo golden mole, Calcochloris leucorhinus DD

Order: Macroscelidea (elephant shrews) 

Often called sengi, the elephant shrews or jumping shrews are native to southern Africa. Their common English name derives from their elongated flexible snout and their resemblance to the true shrews.

Family: Macroscelididae (elephant shrews)
Genus: Elephantulus
 Short-snouted elephant shrew, Elephantulus brachyrhynchus LC
 Bushveld elephant shrew, Elephantulus intufi LC
 Western rock elephant shrew, Elephantulus rupestris LC
Genus: Petrodromus
 Four-toed elephant shrew, Petrodromus tetradactylus LC

Order: Tubulidentata (aardvarks) 

The order Tubulidentata consists of a single species, the aardvark. Tubulidentata are characterised by their teeth which lack a pulp cavity and form thin tubes which are continuously worn down and replaced.

Family: Orycteropodidae
Genus: Orycteropus
 Aardvark, O. afer

Order: Hyracoidea (hyraxes) 

The hyraxes are any of four species of fairly small, thickset, herbivorous mammals in the order Hyracoidea. About the size of a domestic cat they are well-furred, with rounded bodies and a stumpy tail. They are native to Africa and the Middle East.

Family: Procaviidae (hyraxes)
Genus: Dendrohyrax
 Southern tree hyrax, Dendrohyrax arboreus LC
Genus: Heterohyrax
 Yellow-spotted rock hyrax, Heterohyrax brucei LC
 Genus: Procavia
 Cape hyrax, Procavia capensis LC

Order: Proboscidea (elephants) 

The elephants comprise three living species and are the largest living land animals.
Family: Elephantidae (elephants)
Genus: Loxodonta
African bush elephant, L. africana 
African forest elephant, L. cyclotis

Order: Sirenia (manatees and dugongs) 

Sirenia is an order of fully aquatic, herbivorous mammals that inhabit rivers, estuaries, coastal marine waters, swamps, and marine wetlands. All four species are endangered.

Family: Trichechidae
Genus: Trichechus
 African manatee, Trichechus senegalensis VU

Order: Primates 

The order Primates contains humans and their closest relatives: lemurs, lorisoids, tarsiers, monkeys, and apes.

Suborder: Strepsirrhini
Infraorder: Lemuriformes
Superfamily: Lorisoidea
Family: Lorisidae
Genus: Arctocebus
 Golden angwantibo, Arctocebus aureus LR/nt
Genus: Perodicticus
 Potto, Perodicticus potto LR/lc
Family: Galagidae
Genus: Sciurocheirus
 Bioko Allen's bushbaby, Sciurocheirus alleni LR/nt
Genus: Galago
 Mohol bushbaby, Galago moholi LR/lc
Genus: Galagoides
 Prince Demidoff's bushbaby, Galagoides demidovii LR/lc
 Thomas's bushbaby, Galagoides thomasi LR/lc
Genus: Otolemur
 Brown greater galago, Otolemur crassicaudatus LR/lc
Genus: Euoticus
 Southern needle-clawed bushbaby, Euoticus elegantulus LR/nt
Suborder: Haplorhini
Infraorder: Simiiformes
Parvorder: Catarrhini
Superfamily: Cercopithecoidea
Family: Cercopithecidae (Old World monkeys)
Genus: Allenopithecus
 Allen's swamp monkey, Allenopithecus nigroviridis LR/nt
Genus: Miopithecus
 Angolan talapoin, Miopithecus talapoin LR/lc
Genus: Chlorocebus
 Malbrouck, Chlorocebus cynosuros LR/lc
Genus: Cercopithecus
 Red-tailed monkey, Cercopithecus ascanius LR/lc
 Moustached guenon, Cercopithecus cephus LR/lc
 Blue monkey, Cercopithecus mitis LR/lc
 De Brazza's monkey, Cercopithecus neglectus LR/lc
 Greater spot-nosed monkey, Cercopithecus nictitans LR/lc
 Crowned guenon, Cercopithecus pogonias LR/lc
Genus: Lophocebus
 Grey-cheeked mangabey, Lophocebus albigena LR/lc
 Black crested mangabey, Lophocebus aterrimus LR/nt
Genus: Papio
 Yellow baboon, Papio cynocephalus LR/lc
 Chacma baboon, Papio ursinus LR/lc
Subfamily: Colobinae
Genus: Colobus
 Angola colobus, Colobus angolensis LR/lc
Superfamily: Hominoidea
Family: Hominidae
Subfamily: Homininae
Tribe: Gorillini
Genus: Gorilla
 Western gorilla, Gorilla gorilla EN
Tribe: Panini
Genus: Pan
 Common chimpanzee, Pan troglodytes EN

Order: Rodentia (rodents) 

Rodents make up the largest order of mammals, with over 40 percent of mammalian species. They have two incisors in the upper and lower jaw which grow continually and must be kept short by gnawing. Most rodents are small though the capybara can weigh up to 45 kg (100 lb).

Suborder: Hystricomorpha
Family: Bathyergidae
Genus: Cryptomys
 Bocage's mole-rat, Cryptomys bocagei DD
 Damaraland mole-rat, Cryptomys damarensis LC
 Mechow's mole-rat, Cryptomys mechowi LC
Family: Petromuridae
Genus: Petromus
 Dassie rat, Petromus typicus LC
Suborder: Sciurognathi
Family: Anomaluridae
Subfamily: Anomalurinae
Genus: Anomalurus
 Lord Derby's scaly-tailed squirrel, Anomalurus derbianus LC
Genus: Anomalurops
 Beecroft's scaly-tailed squirrel, Anomalurops beecrofti LC
Family: Pedetidae (spring hare)
Genus: Pedetes
 Springhare, Pedetes capensis LC
Family: Sciuridae (squirrels)
Subfamily: Xerinae
Tribe: Xerini
Genus: Xerus
 Mountain ground squirrel, Xerus princeps LC
Tribe: Protoxerini
Genus: Funisciurus
 Lunda rope squirrel, Funisciurus bayonii DD
 Congo rope squirrel, Funisciurus congicus LC
 Fire-footed rope squirrel, Funisciurus pyrropus LC
Genus: Heliosciurus
 Gambian sun squirrel, Heliosciurus gambianus LC
Genus: Paraxerus
 Smith's bush squirrel, Paraxerus cepapi LC
Genus: Protoxerus
 Forest giant squirrel, Protoxerus stangeri LC
Family: Gliridae (dormice)
Subfamily: Graphiurinae
Genus: Graphiurus
 Angolan African dormouse, Graphiurus angolensis DD
 Kellen's dormouse, Graphiurus kelleni DD
 Small-eared dormouse, Graphiurus microtis LC
 Monard's dormouse, Graphiurus monardi DD
 Rock dormouse, Graphiurus platyops LC
 Stone dormouse, Graphiurus rupicola LC
Family: Spalacidae
Subfamily: Tachyoryctinae
Genus: Tachyoryctes
 Ankole African mole-rat, Tachyoryctes ankoliae
Family: Nesomyidae
Subfamily: Petromyscinae
Genus: Petromyscus
 Pygmy rock mouse, Petromyscus collinus LC
 Shortridge's rock mouse, Petromyscus shortridgei LC
Subfamily: Dendromurinae
Genus: Dendromus
 Gray climbing mouse, Dendromus melanotis LC
 Chestnut climbing mouse, Dendromus mystacalis LC
 Nyika climbing mouse, Dendromus nyikae LC
 Vernay's climbing mouse, Dendromus vernayi DD
Genus: Malacothrix
 Gerbil mouse, Malacothrix typica LC
Genus: Steatomys
 Kreb's fat mouse, Steatomys krebsii LC
 Tiny fat mouse, Steatomys parvus LC
 Fat mouse, Steatomys pratensis LC
Subfamily: Cricetomyinae
Genus: Cricetomys
 Gambian pouched rat, Cricetomys gambianus LC
Genus: Saccostomus
 South African pouched mouse, Saccostomus campestris LC
Family: Muridae (mice, rats, voles, gerbils, hamsters, etc.)
Subfamily: Deomyinae
Genus: Lophuromys
 Yellow-spotted brush-furred rat, Lophuromys flavopunctatus LC
 Rusty-bellied brush-furred rat, Lophuromys sikapusi LC
Subfamily: Otomyinae
Genus: Otomys
 Angolan vlei rat, Otomys anchietae LC
 Cuanza vlei rat, Otomys cuanzensis LC
 Large vlei rat, Otomys maximus LC
Subfamily: Gerbillinae
Genus: Desmodillus
 Cape short-eared gerbil, Desmodillus auricularis LC
Genus: Gerbillurus
 Hairy-footed gerbil, Gerbillurus paeba LC
 Namib brush-tailed gerbil, Gerbillurus setzeri LC
Genus: Tatera
 Boehm's gerbil, Tatera boehmi LC
 Highveld gerbil, Tatera brantsii LC
 Bushveld gerbil, Tatera leucogaster LC
 Savanna gerbil, Tatera valida LC
Subfamily: Murinae
Genus: Aethomys
 Bocage's rock rat, Aethomys bocagei LC
 Red rock rat, Aethomys chrysophilus LC
 Kaiser's rock rat, Aethomys kaiseri LC
 Namaqua rock rat, Aethomys namaquensis LC
 Nyika rock rat, Aethomys nyikae LC
 Thomas's rock rat, Aethomys thomasi LC
Genus: Colomys
 African wading rat, Colomys goslingi LC
Genus: Dasymys
 African marsh rat, Dasymys incomtus LC
 Angolan marsh rat, Dasymys nudipes NT
Genus: Grammomys
 Woodland thicket rat, Grammomys dolichurus LC
 Shining thicket rat, Grammomys rutilans LC
Genus: Hybomys
 Peters's striped mouse, Hybomys univittatus LC
Genus: Hylomyscus
 Allen's wood mouse, Hylomyscus alleni LC
 Angolan wood mouse, Hylomyscus carillus LC
 Montane wood mouse, Hylomyscus denniae LC
Genus: Lemniscomys
 Griselda's striped grass mouse, Lemniscomys griselda LC
 Single-striped grass mouse, Lemniscomys rosalia LC
 Rosevear's striped grass mouse, Lemniscomys roseveari DD
 Typical striped grass mouse, Lemniscomys striatus LC
Genus: Malacomys
 Big-eared swamp rat, Malacomys longipes LC
Genus: Mastomys
 Southern multimammate mouse, Mastomys coucha LC
 Natal multimammate mouse, Mastomys natalensis LC
 Shortridge's multimammate mouse, Mastomys shortridgei LC
Genus: Mus
 Callewaert's mouse, Mus callewaerti DD
 Desert pygmy mouse, Mus indutus LC
 African pygmy mouse, Mus minutoides LC
 Thomas's pygmy mouse, Mus sorella LC
 Gray-bellied pygmy mouse, Mus triton LC
Genus: Mylomys
 African groove-toothed rat, Mylomys dybowskii LC
Genus: Myomyscus
 Angolan multimammate mouse, Myomyscus angolensis LC
Genus: Oenomys
 Common rufous-nosed rat, Oenomys hypoxanthus LC
Genus: Pelomys
 Bell groove-toothed swamp rat, Pelomys campanae LC
 Creek groove-toothed swamp rat, Pelomys fallax LC
 Least groove-toothed swamp rat, Pelomys minor LC
Genus: Praomys
 Jackson's soft-furred mouse, Praomys jacksoni LC
 Tullberg's soft-furred mouse, Praomys tullbergi LC
Genus: Rhabdomys
 Four-striped grass mouse, Rhabdomys pumilio LC
Genus: Thallomys
 Black-tailed tree rat, Thallomys nigricauda LC
Genus: Zelotomys
 Hildegarde's broad-headed mouse, Zelotomys hildegardeae LC
 Woosnam's broad-headed mouse, Zelotomys woosnami LC

Order: Lagomorpha (lagomorphs) 

The lagomorphs comprise two families, Leporidae (hares and rabbits), and Ochotonidae (pikas). Though they can resemble rodents, and were classified as a superfamily in that order until the early 20th century, they have since been considered a separate order. They differ from rodents in a number of physical characteristics, such as having four incisors in the upper jaw rather than two.

Family: Leporidae (rabbits, hares)
Genus: Poelagus
 Bunyoro rabbit, Poelagus marjorita LR/lc
Genus: Pronolagus
 Jameson's red rock hare, Pronolagus randensis LR/lc
Genus: Lepus
 Cape hare, Lepus capensis LR/lc

Order: Erinaceomorpha (hedgehogs and gymnures) 

The order Erinaceomorpha contains a single family, Erinaceidae, which comprise the hedgehogs and gymnures. The hedgehogs are easily recognised by their spines while gymnures look more like large rats.

Family: Erinaceidae (hedgehogs)
Subfamily: Erinaceinae
Genus: Atelerix
 Southern African hedgehog, Atelerix frontalis LR/lc

Order: Soricomorpha (shrews, moles, and solenodons) 

The "shrew-forms" are insectivorous mammals. The shrews and solenodons closely resemble mice while the moles are stout-bodied burrowers.

Family: Soricidae (shrews)
Subfamily: Crocidurinae
Genus: Crocidura
 Reddish-gray musk shrew, Crocidura cyanea LC
 Heather shrew, Crocidura erica DD
 Bicolored musk shrew, Crocidura fuscomurina LC
 Lesser red musk shrew, Crocidura hirta LC
 Moonshine shrew, Crocidura luna LC
 Swamp musk shrew, Crocidura mariquensis LC
 Blackish white-toothed shrew, Crocidura nigricans LC
 African black shrew, Crocidura nigrofusca LC
 African giant shrew, Crocidura olivieri LC
 Small-footed shrew, Crocidura parvipes LC
 Roosvelt's shrew, Crocidura roosevelti LC
 Lesser gray-brown musk shrew, Crocidura silacea LC
 Turbo shrew, Crocidura turba LC
Genus: Suncus
 Greater dwarf shrew, Suncus lixus LC
Genus: Sylvisorex
 Climbing shrew, Sylvisorex megalura LC

Order: Chiroptera (bats) 

The bats' most distinguishing feature is that their forelimbs are developed as wings, making them the only mammals capable of flight. Bat species account for about 20% of all mammals.

Family: Pteropodidae (flying foxes, Old World fruit bats)
Subfamily: Pteropodinae
Genus: Eidolon
 Straw-coloured fruit bat, Eidolon helvum LC
Genus: Epomophorus
 Angolan epauletted fruit bat, Epomophorus angolensis NT
 Peters's epauletted fruit bat, Epomophorus crypturus LC
 Lesser Angolan epauletted fruit bat, Epomophorus grandis DD
 Wahlberg's epauletted fruit bat, Epomophorus wahlbergi LC
Genus: Epomops
 Dobson's epauletted fruit bat, Epomops dobsoni LC
 Franquet's epauletted fruit bat, Epomops franqueti LC
Genus: Hypsignathus
 Hammer-headed bat, Hypsignathus monstrosus LC
Genus: Lissonycteris
 Angolan rousette, Lissonycteris angolensis LC
Genus: Micropteropus
 Hayman's dwarf epauletted fruit bat, Micropteropus intermedius DD
 Peters's dwarf epauletted fruit bat, Micropteropus pusillus LC
Genus: Myonycteris
 Little collared fruit bat, Myonycteris torquata LC
Genus: Plerotes
 D'Anchieta's fruit bat, Plerotes anchietae DD
Genus: Rousettus
 Egyptian fruit bat, Rousettus aegyptiacus LC
Subfamily: Macroglossinae
Genus: Megaloglossus
 Woermann's bat, Megaloglossus woermanni LC
Family: Vespertilionidae
Subfamily: Kerivoulinae
Genus: Kerivoula
 Damara woolly bat, Kerivoula argentata LC
Subfamily: Myotinae
Genus: Cistugo
 Angolan hairy bat, Cistugo seabrai NT
Genus: Myotis
 Rufous mouse-eared bat, Myotis bocagii LC
 Welwitsch's bat, Myotis welwitschii LC
Subfamily: Vespertilioninae
Genus: Glauconycteris
 Silvered bat, Glauconycteris argentata LC
 Beatrix's bat, Glauconycteris beatrix NT
 Machado's butterfly bat, Glauconycteris machadoi DD
 Butterfly bat, Glauconycteris variegata LC
Genus: Hypsugo
 Anchieta's pipistrelle, Hypsugo anchietae LC
 Broad-headed pipistrelle, Hypsugo crassulus LC
Genus: Laephotis
 Angolan long-eared bat, Laephotis angolensis NT
Genus: Mimetillus
 Moloney's mimic bat, Mimetillus moloneyi LC
Genus: Neoromicia
 Cape serotine, Neoromicia capensis LC
 Yellow serotine, Neoromicia flavescens DD
 Banana pipistrelle, Neoromicia nanus LC
 White-winged serotine, Neoromicia tenuipinnis LC
 Zulu serotine, Neoromicia zuluensis LC
Genus: Nycticeinops
 Schlieffen's bat, Nycticeinops schlieffeni LC
Genus: Pipistrellus
 Rüppell's pipistrelle, Pipistrellus rueppelli LC
 Rusty pipistrelle, Pipistrellus rusticus LC
Genus: Scotoecus
 White-bellied lesser house bat, Scotoecus albigula DD
 Dark-winged lesser house bat, Scotoecus hirundo DD
Genus: Scotophilus
 White-bellied yellow bat, Scotophilus leucogaster LC
Subfamily: Miniopterinae
Genus: Miniopterus
 Natal long-fingered bat, Miniopterus natalensis NT
Family: Molossidae
Genus: Chaerephon
 Ansorge's free-tailed bat, Chaerephon ansorgei LC
 Nigerian free-tailed bat, Chaerephon nigeriae LC
 Little free-tailed bat, Chaerephon pumila LC
Genus: Mops
 Angolan free-tailed bat, Mops condylurus LC
 White-bellied free-tailed bat, Mops niveiventer LC
Genus: Otomops
 Large-eared free-tailed bat, Otomops martiensseni NT
Genus: Tadarida
 Egyptian free-tailed bat, Tadarida aegyptiaca LC
Family: Emballonuridae
Genus: Coleura
 African sheath-tailed bat, Coleura afra LC
Genus: Saccolaimus
 Pel's pouched bat, Saccolaimus peli NT
Genus: Taphozous
 Mauritian tomb bat, Taphozous mauritianus LC
Family: Nycteridae
Genus: Nycteris
 Bate's slit-faced bat, Nycteris arge LC
 Hairy slit-faced bat, Nycteris hispida LC
 Intermediate slit-faced bat, Nycteris intermedia NT
 Large-eared slit-faced bat, Nycteris macrotis LC
 Dwarf slit-faced bat, Nycteris nana LC
 Egyptian slit-faced bat, Nycteris thebaica LC
Family: Rhinolophidae
Subfamily: Rhinolophinae
Genus: Rhinolophus
 Geoffroy's horseshoe bat, Rhinolophus clivosus LC
 Darling's horseshoe bat, Rhinolophus darlingi LC
 Dent's horseshoe bat, Rhinolophus denti DD
 Rüppell's horseshoe bat, Rhinolophus fumigatus LC
 Lander's horseshoe bat, Rhinolophus landeri LC
 Swinny's horseshoe bat, Rhinolophus swinnyi NT
Subfamily: Hipposiderinae
Genus: Hipposideros
 Sundevall's roundleaf bat, Hipposideros caffer LC
 Giant roundleaf bat, Hipposideros gigas LC
 Noack's roundleaf bat, Hipposideros ruber LC
Genus: Triaenops
 Persian trident bat, Triaenops persicus LC

Order: Pholidota (pangolins) 

The order Pholidota comprises the eight species of pangolin. Pangolins are anteaters and have the powerful claws, elongated snout and long tongue seen in the other unrelated anteater species.

Family: Manidae
Genus: Manis
 Giant pangolin, Manis gigantea LR/lc
 Ground pangolin, Manis temminckii LR/nt
 Long-tailed pangolin, Manis tetradactyla LR/lc
 Tree pangolin, Manis tricuspis LR/lc

Order: Cetacea (whales) 

The order Cetacea includes whales, dolphins and porpoises. They are the mammals most fully adapted to aquatic life with a spindle-shaped nearly hairless body, protected by a thick layer of blubber, and forelimbs and tail modified to provide propulsion underwater.

Suborder: Mysticeti
Family: Balaenopteridae
Subfamily: Balaenopterinae
Genus: Balaenoptera
 Common minke whale, Balaenoptera acutorostrata LC
 Antarctic minke whale, Balaenoptera bonaerensis DD
 Sei whale, Balaenoptera borealis EN
 Bryde's whale, Balaenoptera edeni DD
 Blue whale, Balaenoptera musculus EN
 Fin whale, Balaenoptera physalus EN
Subfamily: Megapterinae
Genus: Megaptera
 Humpback whale, Megaptera novaeangliae VU
Family: Balaenidae
Genus: Eubalaena
 Southern right whale, Eubalaena australis LR/cd
Suborder: Odontoceti
Superfamily: Platanistoidea
Family: Physeteridae
Genus: Physeter
 Sperm whale, Physeter macrocephalus VU
Family: Kogiidae
Genus: Kogia
 Pygmy sperm whale, Kogia breviceps LR/lc
 Dwarf sperm whale, Kogia sima LR/lc
Family: Ziphidae
Subfamily: Hyperoodontinae
Genus: Mesoplodon
 Blainville's beaked whale, Mesoplodon densirostris DD
 Gray's beaked whale, Mesoplodon grayi DD
Genus: Ziphius
 Cuvier's beaked whale, Ziphius cavirostris DD
Family: Delphinidae (marine dolphins)
Genus: Cephalorhynchus
 Heaviside's dolphin, Cephalorhynchus heavisidii DD
Genus: Steno
 Rough-toothed dolphin, Steno bredanensis DD
Genus: Tursiops
 Common bottlenose dolphin, Tursiops truncatus DD
Genus: Stenella
 Pantropical spotted dolphin, Stenella attenuata LR/cd
 Striped dolphin, Stenella coeruleoalba LR/cd
 Atlantic spotted dolphin, Stenella frontalis DD
 Spinner dolphin, Stenella longirostris LR/cd
Genus: Lagenodelphis
 Fraser's dolphin, Lagenodelphis hosei DD
Genus: Orcinus
 Orca, Orcinus orca LR/cd
Genus: Feresa
 Pygmy killer whale, Feresa attenuata DD
Genus: Pseudorca
 False killer whale, Pseudorca crassidens LR/lc
Genus: Globicephala
 Short-finned pilot whale, Globicephala macrorhynchus LR/cd
Genus: Peponocephala
 Melon-headed whale, Peponocephala electra DD

Order: Carnivora (carnivorans) 

There are over 260 species of carnivorans, the majority of which feed primarily on meat. They have a characteristic skull shape and dentition.
Suborder: Feliformia
Family: Felidae (cats)
Subfamily: Felinae
Genus: Acinonyx
 Cheetah, Acinonyx jubatus VU
Genus: Caracal
Caracal, C. caracal LC
African golden cat, C. aurata 
Genus: Felis
Black-footed cat, Felis nigripes VU
African wildcat, F. lybica 
Genus: Leptailurus
 Serval, Leptailurus serval LC
Subfamily: Pantherinae
Genus: Panthera
 Lion, Panthera leo VU
 Leopard, Panthera pardus VU
Family: Viverridae
Subfamily: Viverrinae
Genus: Civettictis
 African civet, Civettictis civetta LC
Genus: Genetta
 Angolan genet, Genetta angolensis LC
 Common genet, Genetta genetta LC
 Rusty-spotted genet, Genetta maculata LC
Family: Nandiniidae
Genus: Nandinia
 African palm civet, Nandinia binotata LC
Family: Herpestidae (mongooses)
Genus: Atilax
 Marsh mongoose, Atilax paludinosus LC
Genus: Crossarchus
 Angolan kusimanse, Crossarchus ansorgei LC
Genus: Cynictis
 Yellow mongoose, Cynictis penicillata LC
Genus: Helogale
 Common dwarf mongoose, Helogale parvula LC
Genus: Herpestes
 Angolan slender mongoose, Herpestes flavescens LC
Egyptian mongoose, Herpestes ichneumon LC
Common slender mongoose, Herpestes sanguinea LC
Genus: Ichneumia
White-tailed mongoose, I. albicauda 
Genus: Mungos
 Banded mongoose, Mungos mungo LC
Genus: Paracynictis
 Selous' mongoose, Paracynictis selousi LC
Genus: Suricata
 Meerkat, Suricata suricatta LC
Family: Hyaenidae (hyaenas)
Genus: Crocuta
 Spotted hyena, Crocuta crocuta LC
Genus: Parahyaena
 Brown hyena, P. brunnea NT
Genus: Proteles
 Aardwolf, Proteles cristatus LC
Suborder: Caniformia
Family: Canidae (dogs, foxes)
Genus: Lupulella
 Side-striped jackal, L. adusta  
 Black-backed jackal, L. mesomelas  
Genus: Vulpes
 Cape fox, Vulpes chama LC
Genus: Otocyon
 Bat-eared fox, Otocyon megalotis LC
Genus: Lycaon
 African wild dog, Lycaon pictus EN
Family: Mustelidae (mustelids)
Genus: Ictonyx
 Striped polecat, Ictonyx striatus LC
Genus: Poecilogale
 African striped weasel, Poecilogale albinucha LC
Genus: Mellivora
 Honey badger, Mellivora capensis LC
Genus: Hydrictis
 Speckle-throated otter, Hydrictis maculicollis LC
Genus: Aonyx
 African clawless otter, Aonyx capensis LC
 Cameroon clawless otter, Aonyx congicus NT
Family: Otariidae (eared seals, sealions)
Genus: Arctocephalus
 Cape fur seal, Arctocephalus pusillus LC
Family: Phocidae (earless seals)
Genus: Mirounga
 Southern elephant seal, Mirounga leonina LC

Order: Perissodactyla (odd-toed ungulates) 

The odd-toed ungulates are browsing and grazing mammals. They are usually large to very large, and have relatively simple stomachs and a large middle toe.

Family: Equidae (horses etc.)
Genus: Equus
Plains zebra, E. quagga 
Chapman's zebra, E. q. chapmani
Burchell's zebra, E. q. burchellii
Grant's zebra, E. q. boehmi 
Mountain zebra, E. zebra 
Hartmann's mountain zebra, E. z. hartmannae
Family: Rhinocerotidae
Genus: Diceros
Black rhinoceros, D. bicornis 
South-central black rhinoceros, D. b. minor 
South-western black rhinoceros, D. b. occidentalis

Order: Artiodactyla (even-toed ungulates) 

The even-toed ungulates are ungulates whose weight is borne about equally by the third and fourth toes, rather than mostly or entirely by the third as in perissodactyls. There are about 220 artiodactyl species, including many that are of great economic importance to humans.
Family: Suidae (pigs)
Subfamily: Phacochoerinae
Genus: Phacochoerus
 Common warthog, Phacochoerus africanus
Subfamily: Suinae
Genus: Potamochoerus
 Bushpig, Potamochoerus larvatus
Family: Hippopotamidae (hippopotamuses)
Genus: Hippopotamus
 Hippopotamus, Hippopotamus amphibius VU
Family: Tragulidae
Genus: Hyemoschus
 Hyemoschus aquaticus DD
Family: Giraffidae (giraffe, okapi)
Genus: Giraffa
 Angolan giraffe, Giraffa giraffa angolensis VU
Family: Bovidae (cattle, antelope, sheep, goats)
Subfamily: Alcelaphinae
Genus: Alcelaphus
Hartebeest, A. buselaphus 
 Lichtenstein's hartebeest, A. lichtensteinii
Genus: Connochaetes
 Blue wildebeest, Connochaetes taurinus
Genus: Damaliscus
 Topi, Damaliscus lunatus
Subfamily: Antilopinae
Genus: Antidorcas
 Springbok antelope, Antidorcas marsupialis
Genus: Madoqua
 Kirk's dik-dik, Madoqua kirkii
Genus: Oreotragus
 Klipspringer, Oreotragus oreotragus
Genus: Ourebia
 Oribi, Ourebia ourebi
Genus: Raphicerus
 Steenbok, Raphicerus campestris
Subfamily: Bovinae
Genus: Syncerus
African buffalo, S. caffer 
Genus: Tragelaphus
 Bongo, Tragelaphus eurycerus
 Common eland, Tragelaphus oryx
 Bushbuck, Tragelaphus scriptus
 Sitatunga, Tragelaphus spekii
 Greater kudu, Tragelaphus strepsiceros
Subfamily: Cephalophinae
Genus: Cephalophus
 Bay duiker, Cephalophus dorsalis
 Blue duiker, Cephalophus monticola
 Black-fronted duiker, Cephalophus nigrifrons
 Yellow-backed duiker, Cephalophus silvicultor
Genus: Sylvicapra
 Common duiker, Sylvicapra grimmia
Subfamily: Hippotraginae
Genus: Hippotragus
 Roan antelope, Hippotragus equinus
 Sable antelope, Hippotragus niger
Genus: Oryx
 Gemsbok, Oryx gazella LC possibly extirpated
Subfamily: Aepycerotinae
Genus: Aepyceros
 Impala, Aepyceros melampus
Subfamily: Reduncinae
Genus: Kobus
 Waterbuck, Kobus ellipsiprymnus
 Lechwe, Kobus leche
 Puku, Kobus vardonii
Genus: Redunca
 Southern reedbuck, Redunca arundinum

Notes

References

See also
List of chordate orders
Lists of mammals by region
List of prehistoric mammals
Mammal classification
List of mammals described in the 2000s

Angola
Mammals

Angola